The 2007–08 Cypriot Second Division was the 53rd season of the Cypriot second-level football league. AEP Paphos won their 2nd title.

Format
Fourteen teams participated in the 2007–08 Cypriot Second Division. All teams played against each other twice, once at their home and once away. The team with the most points at the end of the season crowned champions. The first three teams were promoted to 2008–09 Cypriot First Division and the last three teams were relegated to the 2008–09 Cypriot Third Division.

Changes from previous season
Teams promoted to 2007–08 Cypriot First Division
 APOP Kinyras
 Alki Larnaca
 Doxa Katokopias

Teams relegated from 2006–07 Cypriot First Division
 Digenis Akritas Morphou
 Ayia Napa
 AEP Paphos

Teams promoted from 2006–07 Cypriot Third Division
 Ermis Aradippou
 Atromitos Yeroskipou
 Olympos Xylofagou

Teams relegated to 2007–08 Cypriot Third Division
 Chalkanoras Idaliou
 Iraklis Gerolakkou
 AEM Mesogis

League standings

Results

See also
 Cypriot Second Division
 2007–08 Cypriot First Division
 2007–08 Cypriot Cup
 2007–08 in Cypriot football

Sources

2. DIVISION 2007–08

Cypriot Second Division seasons
Cyprus
2007–08 in Cypriot football